Herta Ware (June 9, 1917 – August 15, 2005) was an American actress and activist.

Early life
Ware was born Herta Schwartz in Wilmington, Delaware, the daughter of Helen Ware, a musician and violin teacher, and Laszlo Schwartz, an actor who was born in Budapest. Her mother's brother was Harold Ware, who headed the Ware Group, the most extensive Soviet spy ring in American history — and her maternal grandmother was labor organizer and socialist Ella Reeve Bloor, the co-founder of the Communist Labor Party of America and later a member of the central committee of the Communist Party USA. Her father was Jewish and her mother was Christian.

Career

Ware made her Broadway debut in Let Freedom Ring (November 6, 1935–February 1936), co-starring husband Will Geer, whom she had married in 1934. The couple appeared together in other New York plays, including Bury the Dead (1936), Prelude (1936), 200 Were Chosen (1936) and Journeyman (1938), and Six O'Clock Theatre (1948), all of which were short-lived.

She made her on-screen debut in 1978, when she appeared in the television film, A Question of Guilt. Subsequently, she appeared in her first feature film 1980, The Black Marble. Her second feature film was Dr. Heckyl and Mr. Hype, which featured Oliver Reed. She starred in 2010 in 1984. 

She is perhaps most recognized for her performance in the classic film Ron Howard's Cocoon, and appeared in the sequel Cocoon: The Return. She appeared in Critters 2: The Main Course as "Nana".
She had roles in several other well-known films such as, Species, Practical Magic, with Sandra Bullock and Nicole Kidman, and Cruel Intentions, with Sarah Michelle Gellar and Ryan Phillippe. Her role in the 1992 television film Crazy in Love earned her a CableACE Award for Supporting Actress in a Movie or Miniseries.

Ware made many guest appearances on classic television series including, Knots Landing, Highway to Heaven, Cagney & Lacey, The Golden Girls and ER, to name a few. She and her daughter, Ellen both made guest appearances on Star Trek: The Next Generation and Beauty and the Beast.

Personal life
In 1934, Ware married actor Will Geer, with whom she had three children. She and Geer were politically-minded and relocated to Los Angeles in the early 1940s and settled in Santa Monica so that Geer could pursue his movie career. 

In 1951, the passionately left-wing Geer became blacklisted by Hollywood for taking the Fifth Amendment and refusing to testify before the House Un-American Activities Committee. 

With Geer's film career destroyed, and falling into financial difficulties, the couple lost their Los Angeles home. The pair divorced in 1954 but remained close friends. Ware later married actor David Marshall, with whom she had one child, a daughter, actress Melora Marshall. They later divorced. Ware and Geer reunited in 1973 and subsequently co-founded the Will Geer Theatricum Botanicum, which was on five acres of land that Ware purchased in Topanga Canyon for $10,000. The burgeoning theater officially opened as a summer theater in 1973. 

She stayed by Geer's bedside as he died of a respiratory ailment in 1978. In 2000, she published her own memoir Fantastic Journey, My Life with Will Geer.

Death
Ware died on August 15, 2005, due to complications of Parkinson's disease, aged 88, in Topanga, California. Her ashes and those of her ex-husband, Will Geer, were scattered at their outdoor theatre.

Filmography

Film

Television

Television films

Other appearances
 1974 Medieval Theater: The Play of Abraham and Isaac ... Mary Pink, Mother (short documentary)
 1984 Woody Guthrie: Hard Travelin'  (documentary)
 1993 When Jesus Was a Kid (video short)

References

External links

1917 births
2005 deaths
American film actresses
American stage actresses
American television actresses
Deaths from Parkinson's disease
Neurological disease deaths in California
Hollywood blacklist
Actresses from Wilmington, Delaware
20th-century American actresses
Activists from Delaware
21st-century American women